Brookwater is a suburb in the City of Ipswich, Queensland, Australia. It is one of the suburbs of the Greater Springfield Development. In the  Brookwater had a population of 2,151 people.

Geography 
Brookwater is bordered by Bellbird Park to the north, Augustine Heights to the west, Springfield to the east, and Springfield Central in the south.

History
Brookwater was named and bounded in 2003.

The Urban Development Institute of Australia judged Brookwater to be the  best residential subdivision in 2006.

Education
There are no schools in Brookwater. The nearest government primary schools are Augusta State School in neighbouring Augustine Heights to the west and Spring Mountain State School in Spring Mountain to the south-west. The nearest government secondary schools are Redbank Plains State High School in Redbank Plains to the west and Springfield Central State High School in neighbouring Springfield Central to the south.

There is a Goodstart Early Learning childcare centre in Brookwater.

Facilities 
Mater Health Centre Brookwater is a private hospital.

Amenities 
Brookwater Golf and Country Club has an 18-hole golf course at 1 Tournament Drive. The golf course was designed by Greg Norman. The par 72 golf course measures  and has been voted as Queensland's number one golf course in Golf Australia magazine's best 50 courses.  Brookwater has also hosted the Isuzu Queensland Open and the 2015 Emirates Golf Challenge.

Brookwater Village Shopping Centre has a Woolworths shopping centre, restaurants and cafés at 2 Tournament Drive.

There are a number of parks in the suburb, including:

 Myrtle Crescent Park
 Oakmont Park

 Oakview Circuit Park

 Opossum Creek Parklands

 Opossum Creek Wildlife Corridor

 Scenic Park

Transport
The closest train station to Brookwater is Springfield Central railway station on the Springfield railway line. It branches from the Ipswich railway line after Darra railway station.  The Centenary Highway, Logan Motorway and Ipswich Motorway are all nearby.

References

External links

 

Suburbs of Ipswich, Queensland